Collingwood is a town in the north-west corner of the South Island of New Zealand along Golden Bay / Mohua. The town is an ecotourism destination due to its proximity to Kahurangi National Park and Farewell Spit Nature Reserve.

History
The town was originally named Gibbstown after the local settler and politician William Gibbs (1817–1897), who arrived in the area in 1851. The settlement was later renamed Collingwood after Admiral Cuthbert Collingwood, Lord Nelson's second-in-command at the Battle of Trafalgar in 1805.

Following the discovery of payable gold deposits in the Aorere Valley in 1856 the town's population surged. The population peaked at an estimated 2500 gold miners. In 1857 police buildings were built. In 1859 there were 3 merchants, 2 shoemakers, a tailor, 2 butchers and 7 inns. Fire damaged the town in 1859. In 1860 the gold rush was over and the miners had moved on to the West Coast of the South Island. In the late 1870s coal mining created a second mining boom for Collingwood.

A suggestion was made that Collingwood should become New Zealand's capital. In 1864, three Australian commissioners were tasked with recommending a more central location for the capital and they did visit Golden Bay (then still known as Massacre Bay) but their recommendation was for Wellington.

The town has been damaged by fire several times, being almost destroyed in 1904 which started in the bakery and then spread to the general store. Every building on Tasman Street was destroyed.

In 1930 eight buildings were destroyed in a fire including the Collingwood Hotel and the Presbyterian Church. A fire in 1967 started in the Post Office Hotel and destroyed the hotel and the Memorial Hall. A replacement memorial hall was built in 1972 and contains the Collingwood Library.

Geography
Collingwood is located along the western shore of Golden Bay at the mouth of the Aorere River. The town is the endpoint for State Highway 60. The road leaving the town to the southwest goes into the Aorere Valley. The road to the north leads to Cape Farewell via a number of small settlements.

Demographics 

It had a population of 258 at the 2018 New Zealand census, an increase of 12 people (4.9%) since the 2013 census, and an increase of 12 people (4.9%) since the 2006 census. There were 117 households. There were 120 males and 138 females, giving a sex ratio of 0.87 males per female, with 33 people (12.8%) aged under 15 years, 18 (7.0%) aged 15 to 29, 123 (47.7%) aged 30 to 64, and 84 (32.6%) aged 65 or older.

Ethnicities were 95.3% European/Pākehā, 7.0% Māori, 4.7% Asian, and 1.2% other ethnicities (totals add to more than 100% since people could identify with multiple ethnicities).

Although some people objected to giving their religion, 69.8% had no religion, 27.9% were Christian, 1.2% were Buddhist and 2.3% had other religions.

Of those at least 15 years old, 66 (29.3%) people had a bachelor or higher degree, and 39 (17.3%) people had no formal qualifications. The employment status of those at least 15 was that 90 (40.0%) people were employed full-time, 48 (21.3%) were part-time, and 3 (1.3%) were unemployed.

Collingwood is part of the Golden Bay/Mohua SA2 statistical area.

Education
Collingwood Area School is a composite school (Years 1–13) catering for primary, secondary, and adult education in the greater Collingwood area, and has around 130 students on roll. The school celebrated its 150th anniversary in 2009.

Tourism 
Collingwood is home to the only company with a concession to provide tours to Farewell Spit.

Notable buildings

Saint Cuthbert's Anglican Church 

Saint Cuthberts was completed in 1873 and built on land believed to have been donated by the town's founder William Gibbs. Local labour and timber were donated to complete the church. Thomas Brunner designed the church. The church having survived unscathed from the many fires that have damaged Collingwood is a New Zealand Heritage category 1 listed building. The church suffered some minor damage from vandals who were caught and prosecuted in 2011. The church seats approximately 50 people. The congregation numbered approximately 20–25 persons in 2016.

Court house 

The court house, built in 1901 just outside the town as it was then. Owing to its location, it survived the 1904 fire. The courthouse has for many years been used as a cafe.

Post office 
The Post Office was built in 1906 after the 1904 fire and survived the 1930 fire thanks to the Collingwood Volunteer Fire Brigade.

Collingwood Museum 
The Collingwood Museum and Aorere Centre are located on Tasman Street. It was established in 1969 in the former 1910 council office building. It features local historical displays.

Golden Bay Machinery & Settlers Museum 
The Golden Bay Machinery & Settlers Museum is located just outside of Collingwood at 869 Collingwood-Bainham Road, Rockville. The collection includes farm machinery including tractors, vehicles and early settlers items. A number of working pieces of steam machinery are also on display.

Notes

References

Populated places in the Tasman District
Populated places around Golden Bay / Mohua